Orthomegas haxairei is a species of beetle in the family Cerambycidae. It is found in Ecuador, Colombia and Peru.

References

Beetles described in 1993
Prioninae